Events from the year 1754 in Sweden

Incumbents
 Monarch – Adolf Frederick

Events

 
 
 - Foundation of the Stenborg Company, the first known Swedish language theater group to tour Sweden and Finland.
 - The cause célèbre of Risbadstugan. 
 - New law on suicide: people who falsely admitted guilt or committed crimes with the intent of committing suicide through execution were to be punished by pillorying and imprisoned rather than executed.

Births

 
 29 June - Peter Gustaf Tengmalm, naturalist (died 1803)
 June 18 – Anna Maria Lenngren, writer, poet and social critic (died 1817)
 28 July - Abraham Niclas Edelcrantz, poet and inventor (died 1821)
 10 March - Augusta von Fersen courtier, royal mistress and profile of the Gustavian age (died 1846)
 4 December - Nils Lorens Sjöberg, officer and poet  (died 1822)
  - Caroline Lewenhaupt, courtier  (died 1826)
 24 September - Anna Charlotta Schröderheim, salonnière  (died 1791)
 - Georg Johan De Besche, royal favorite  (died 1814)

Deaths

 
 
 
 

 Christina Beata Dagström, glassworks owner (born 1691)

References

 
Years of the 18th century in Sweden